The Great Western Railway (GWR) 4200 Class is a class of  steam locomotives.

History

Development
After the GWR took over operations and then absorbed the various South Wales based railways from the late 1800s, operational practice on most was defined by moving heavy coal trains on sharp, steep and undulating tracks. Thus many of these railways - especially the dominant Taff Vale Railway - specified and used an 0-6-2T, which gave maximum tractive effort whilst riding well on the undulating track.

With coal trains increasing in size and scale, the GWR needed to develop a more powerful locomotive to meet these requirements, on what were relatively short haul routes. Thus in 1906, Chief Engineer George Jackson Churchward took the basic design of his GWR 2800 Class, and adapted it. After proposing a 2-8-2T design, Churchward developed the UK's first 2-8-0 tank engine, through concerns that the longer frames required for a 2-8-2T would restrict operation in the South Wales Valleys.

Churchward upgraded the power of the design, modifying the frames to hold a GWR standard No.4 boiler over the 2800 Class standard No. 1. The flanges of the second and third driving wheels were made thinner, and the coupling rods between the third and fourth sets of driving wheels used spherical joints, all to create side play and hence flexibility in operations. The prototype No. 4201 was out shipped from Swindon Works in 1910 under Lot No. 142, with a straight back bunker capable of containing three tonnes of coal.

Operations
Put into production in 1912 under Lot No. 187, the first locomotives were Nos. 4202 to 4221, which had both top feed boilers and curved upper bodies to their coal bunkers to provide 3.5 tonnes of coal carrying capacity. Working heavy coal trains of over 1,000 tons through the South Wales Valleys, from coal mines to ports, the large boilers and restricted loading gauge resulted in narrow side tanks. Although passing numerous water stops along their routes, because of the class's heavy water consumption and limited tank capacity, they were nicknamed "Water Carts". 105 4200s were built between 1910 and 1923.

Modifications
In 1919, from Lot No. 213 (4262 to 4285) onwards, the coal bunker was built six inches taller, increasing coal capacity to 4 tons. In 1921, having also run out of allocation numbers, the class received its first major upgrade.

The last batch of the 5205 Class produced pre-World War II were lot No. 266 of 1930, producing numbers 5275 to 5294. However, due to the Stock Market Crash of 1929, and a resultant down turn in coal exports to Europe, a number of the 4200 Class having been returned to Swindon for overhaul, had in fact been stored there. To increase their operational ability across the wider GWR network, Chief Engineer Charles Collett took the board-agreed decision to alter this batch in production to 2-8-2T by adding a bolt-on  extension to the frames to accommodate a pair of rear trailing wheels, which took the coal capacity up to 6 tons and water tanks to 2500 gallons. This created the GWR 7200 Class 2-8-2T. Due to demands from the Operational Department for more of the 7200 Class, from the stored 4200 Class locomotives at Swindon, fourteen were rebuilt between 1937 and 1939 as 7200 Class locomotives.

In later years many of the remaining 4200s were upgraded to 5205 specification with outside steam pipes, larger cylinders and in some cases curved frames at the front end.

Withdrawal
All but one, No. 4224, passed in the ownership of British Railways on Nationalisation. The first engine withdrawn was number 4224 in February 1959 and by the end of steam on the former GWR system, 18 were still working at the start of 1965, the last withdrawn being No. 4268 in August 1965.

Preservation
Five have been preserved, with all rescued from Woodham Brothers scrapyard in Barry, Vale of Glamorgan, South Wales. Three of the five surviving members of the 4200 have run in preservation.

In the case of 4277 its name is historically inaccurate, i.e. it being applied in preservation.

Models
In 2012, Hornby released models of the 4200 class in both original GWR green and BR black.

See also 
 List of GWR standard classes with two outside cylinders

References

Railway locomotives introduced in 1910
4200
2-8-0T locomotives
Freight locomotives
Standard gauge steam locomotives of Great Britain
1′D h2t locomotives